Artus Aux-Cousteaux (Hautcousteaux, Haultcousteau, Arthur d'Auxcousteaux; c. 1590-1656) was a French singer and composer, active in Picardy and Paris.

He was born in Picardy in either Beauvais (according to Charles Magnin) or Saint-Quentin (according to Charles Gomart). His family coat of arms contains a pun on his name; it is Azur à trois cousteaux, d'argent garnis d'or ("Azure on three sides, of silver decorated with gold").

He was a singer in the church of Noyon, of which fact there is a record in the library of Amiens. Then he became Maistre de la Sainte Chapelle at Paris.

His style is remarkably in advance of his contemporaries, and François-Joseph Fétis believes him to have studied the Italian masters.

Sources 
Jean-Paul C. Montagnier, The Polyphonic Mass in France, 1600-1780: The Evidence of the Printed Choirbooks, Cambridge: Cambridge University Press, 2017.

External links

 

French Baroque composers
French composers of sacred music
French tenors
1590 births
1656 deaths
People from Picardy
17th-century male musicians